Rev. Fr. Odilo (Otto) Weeger, CMM (14 October 1912 – 8 June 2006) was a Roman Catholic missionary in Matabeleland, Southern Africa. He arrived in Africa in July 1938 and was based at Mariannhill in Natal, South Africa. He was later transferred to Southern Rhodesia where he worked at St. Patrick's in Bulawayo before moving to Lukosi, near Hwange in 1939.

Missionary work in Matabeleland
In the North of Matebeleland, he travelled by bicycle from St. Mary's Lukosi to Hwange, Victoria Falls, Matetsi and Gwayi River. He built and established many schools, including those in Gwayi, Binga, Dete and Lupane and later went to Fatima where he opened a mission hospital and school.

With the support of friends in Germany, who were doctors, he opened St. Luke's Hospital in Lupane. In 1958, he returned to Bulawayo, where he was the parish priest at St. Mary's Cathedral. He was appointed Provincial Superior of Mariannhill Missionaries, a post he held from 1970 to 1982. He was Parish priest for many years of the Hillside parish of Christ the King.

Weeger was awarded the Verdienstkreuz – Erster Klasse (Cross of Merit – First Class) in Germany, on 5 May 1989, for his work in Matabeleland. Weeger's archives are stored in Bulawayo.

References

Sources 
 Alexander, Jocelyn & Ranger, Terence Competition and Integration in the Religious History of North-Western Zimbabwe
 Journal of Religion in Africa, Vol. 28, Fasc. 1 (Feb., 1998), pp. 3–31

1912 births
2006 deaths
Officers Crosses of the Order of Merit of the Federal Republic of Germany
Roman Catholic missionaries in South Africa
German Roman Catholic missionaries
20th-century German Roman Catholic priests
Roman Catholic missionaries in Zimbabwe
German expatriates in South Africa
German expatriates in Zimbabwe